Perle is the eighteenth album released by Gianna Nannini in 2004. It reached number 6 on the Italian album chart and number 22 on the album chart in Switzerland.

Track listing
"Notti Senza Cuore" (Gianna Nannini) - 4:14
"Ragazzo Dell'Europa" (Gianna Nannini) - 4:27
"Contaminata" (Gianna Nannini/M. Malavasi, Gianna Nannini/M. Redeghieri) - 4:49
"Amandoti" (M. Zamboni, G.L. Feretti) - 4:04
"Profumo" (Gianna Nannini/F. Pianigiani, Gianna Nannini) - 3:37
"I Maschi" (Gianna Nannini/F. Pianigiani, Gianna Nannini) - 4:00
"Aria" (Gianna Nannini/F. Sartori, Gianna Nannini/I. Santacroce) - 3:49
"Una Luce" (Gianna Nannini) - 3:17
"California" (Gianna Nannini) - 2:43
"Latin Lover" (Gianna Nannini/M. Paoluzzi, Gianna Nannini) - 4:07
"Meravigliosa Creatura" (Gianna Nannini, Gianna Nannini/M. Redeghieri) - 3:07
"Amore Cannibale" (Gianna Nannini/R. Gulisano/T. Marletta/D. Oliveri, I. Santacroce) - 5:46
"Oh Marinaio" (Gianna Nannini) - 3:48

Personnel 
Gianna Nannini - vocals
Production - Christian Lohr & Gianna Nannini
Executive producer - Peter Zumsteg
Recording engineers - Charly Bohaimid & Christian Lohr
Mixing engineers - Charly Bohaimid & Christian Lohr
Mastering engineer - Tony Cousins

External links
 Gianna Nannini website

2004 albums
Gianna Nannini albums